The Joseph W. Jr. Russ House is a historic site built from 1892 to 1895 in Marianna, Florida. It serves as Jackson County's Visitor a Center, located at 4318 West Lafayette Street. On July 18, 1983,  the house was added to the U.S. National Register of Historic Places. Five generations of the Russ family lived in the house over a 100-year span. He married Bette Dickerson and they had one daughter named Frances. In 1930 he had lost his life. His  daughter Frances lived in the house for 89 years. 

 Many strangers asked to tour the grand home.

External links
Historical Marker Database

References

 Jackson County listings at National Register of Historic Places
 Jackson County listings at Florida's Office of Cultural and Historical Programs

Houses on the National Register of Historic Places in Florida
Houses in Jackson County, Florida
National Register of Historic Places in Jackson County, Florida
1895 establishments in Florida